Mr. Cartoon was a television program for children that aired for over thirty years on WSAZ-TV, the local NBC affiliate in Huntington, West Virginia. The show was hosted by George Lewis until 1969 and by Jule Huffman until 1995. The show ended its run in May 1995 when Huffman retired.

Format
The program consisted of cartoons for a studio audience of children. While cartoons and commercials aired, the children would play off-camera games such as musical chairs. One of show's daily segments featured a selected audience member attempting to answer a riddle as read by Mr. Cartoon.

Production
Jule Huffman conceived the idea of cartoons for a studio audience after George Lewis left the program.

Huffman's "Mr. Cartoon" was accompanied by an animal sidekick, known as "Beeper" who joined the show in 1974. Before that, Beginning in 1968, Mr. Cartoon was generally accompanied by one of Hanna-Barbera's Banana Splits, which ended in December 1969. Beeper was known as Mr. Cartoon's "friend," and got the name Beeper following a contest in which kids sent in their suggestions for the creature's name.

Broadcast history
The show aired at 4 p.m. on weekdays for one hour until September 1988, when the show was replaced in its daily time slot by The Oprah Winfrey Show. From then until May 1995, Mr. Cartoon was shown on Saturday mornings.

Legacy
WSAZ brought back Beeper as a mascot. From 2009 to 2013, during winter months a graphic of Beeper appears on screen when school closing and delay announcements are made.

References

External links

 

Year of television series debut missing
Local children's television programming in the United States
1950s American children's television series
1960s American children's television series
1970s American children's television series
1980s American children's television series
1990s American children's television series
1995 American television series endings
American television shows featuring puppetry